Central Presbyterian Church is a historic church located in downtown Denver, Colorado. Its building was built in 1891–92 and designed by Frank E. Edbrooke in the Richardsonian Romanesque style. It was added to the National Register of Historic Places in 1974.

The church was an offshoot of the First Presbyterian Church of Denver, which was organized in 1860.  The Central Presbyterian Church congregation received its name in 1874.

Its building was documented by the Historic American Buildings Survey in 1969.

The building has been considered one of the three best buildings designed by Edbrooke, and was designed late in his career.

It is described: "'The church is enormous, it is a nearly perfect square and is basically a four-tower type with crossing gables of equal height and length. The feeling of massiveness is derived from its great size and large windows and from the use of Colorado sandstone laid in horizontal bands like Richardson's later work. In the words of art historian Richard Brettell, the church is spare, simple and coloristically unified. The walls are sheer and relatively unadorned, rising with a thin and expansive grace. The thin stretched quality is almost exaggerated in the tower where there are long, thin lantern openings topped by ogee arches."

References

External links

Colorado State Register of Historic Properties
Presbyterian churches in Colorado
Churches on the National Register of Historic Places in Colorado
Romanesque Revival church buildings in Colorado
Churches completed in 1891
National Register of Historic Places in Denver